Cryptographis is a genus of moths of the family Crambidae.

Species 
 Cryptographis abruptalis
 Cryptographis aclista
 Cryptographis advenalis
 Cryptographis albianalis
 Cryptographis albicincta
 Cryptographis albifascialis
 Cryptographis albifuscalis
 Cryptographis andringitralis
 Cryptographis angustimarga
 Cryptographis antillia
 Cryptographis argealis
 Cryptographis arguta
 Cryptographis aroalis
 Cryptographis attigua
 Cryptographis auricollis
 Cryptographis auricostalis
 Cryptographis aurogrisealis
 Cryptographis beckeri
 Cryptographis brevilinealis
 Cryptographis brunneacollis
 Cryptographis buscki
 Cryptographis capensis
 Cryptographis celestinalis
 Cryptographis clavata
 Cryptographis columbiana
 Cryptographis contactalis
 Cryptographis costaricalis
 Cryptographis cucurbitalis
 Cryptographis culminalis
 Cryptographis cumalis
 Cryptographis curcubitalis
 Cryptographis damalis
 Cryptographis decapitalis
 Cryptographis deosalis
 Cryptographis dohrni
 Cryptographis eburnealis
 Cryptographis elealis
 Cryptographis elegans
 Cryptographis equicincta
 Cryptographis eumeusalis
 Cryptographis eurytornalis
 Cryptographis euryzonalis
 Cryptographis exclusalis
 Cryptographis fimalis
 Cryptographis fuligalis
 Cryptographis fumosalis
 Cryptographis fuscicaudalis
 Cryptographis fuscicollis
 Cryptographis gazorialis
 Cryptographis gigantalis
 Cryptographis gilvidorsis
 Cryptographis glauculalis
 Cryptographis grisealis
 Cryptographis guatemalalis
 Cryptographis guenealis
 Cryptographis hemicitralis
 Cryptographis holophaealis
 Cryptographis holophoenica
 Cryptographis horocrates
 Cryptographis hyalinalis
 Cryptographis hyalinata
 Cryptographis immaculalis
 Cryptographis indica
 Cryptographis infernalis
 Cryptographis infimalis
 Cryptographis intermedialis
 Cryptographis interpositalis
 Cryptographis jacobsalis
 Cryptographis lacustralis
 Cryptographis latilimbalis
 Cryptographis limitalis
 Cryptographis lucernalis
 Cryptographis lucidalis
 Cryptographis lustralis
 Cryptographis magdalenae
 Cryptographis marginalis
 Cryptographis marginepuncta
 Cryptographis marianalis
 Cryptographis mirabilis
 Cryptographis modialis
 Cryptographis monothyralis
 Cryptographis morosalis
 Cryptographis nigricilialis
 Cryptographis nitidalis
 Cryptographis niveocilia
 Cryptographis novicialis
 Cryptographis ochrivitralis
 Cryptographis oeditornalis
 Cryptographis olealis
 Cryptographis oleosalis
 Cryptographis orthozonalis
 Cryptographis peridromella
 Cryptographis perspectalis
 Cryptographis plumbidorsalis
 Cryptographis polypaetalis
 Cryptographis praxialis
 Cryptographis punctilinealis
 Cryptographis purpurea
 Cryptographis sahlkei
 Cryptographis salmenalis
 Cryptographis satanalis
 Cryptographis schroederi
 Cryptographis semaphoralis
 Cryptographis semibrunnea
 Cryptographis stenocraspis
 Cryptographis subauralis
 Cryptographis subtilalis
 Cryptographis superalis
 Cryptographis taenialis
 Cryptographis terminalis
 Cryptographis translucidalis
 Cryptographis venatalis
 Cryptographis vitralis
 Cryptographis zygaenalis

 Names brought to synonymy
 Cryptographis semirufalis, a synonym for Desmia semirufalis
 Cryptographis rogenhoferi, a synonym for Palpita elealis

References

External links 
 

 
 Cryptographis at the Interim Register of Marine and Nonmarine Genera

Pyraustinae
Crambidae genera
Taxa named by Julius Lederer